Mirabad (also Romanized as Mīrābād; also known as Mehrābād and Mihrābād) is a village in Mazul Rural District, in the Central District of Nishapur County, Razavi Khorasan Province, Iran. At the 2006 census, its population was 2,331, in 581 families.

References 

Populated places in Nishapur County